Lang Zheng (born 22 July 1986) is a retired Chinese footballer.

Club career
Lang Zheng started his football career when he joined Beijing Guoan in the 2006 season and would eventually make his debut against Changchun Yatai on 15 October 2006 in a 1-0 win, coming on as a late substitute. By the 2007 league season, he would continue to further establish himself within the team when he started his first league game on 16 June 2007 against Tianjin Teda, which Beijing lost 1-0. He would remain a squad regular until the 2009 league season when he would eventually break into the first team and help Beijing win the league title as well as also scoring his first goal against Qingdao Jonoon on 26 September 2009 in a 1-0 victory.

After spending several seasons behind Xu Yunlong and Zhang Yonghai in the defense, then manager Jaime Pacheco would promote youngsters Lei Tenglong and Yu Yang into the senior squad and after making only three appearances for the team during the 2011 league season, Lang was allowed to go on loan to Nanchang Hengyuan during the season. Lang was brought in to help the club fight off relegation and he would go on to make his debut against Hangzhou Greentown on 10 July 2011 where he came on as a late substitute in a 1-0 win. He would make several further appearances for Nanchang and even scored a goal against Shaanxi Chanba in a 3-1 win on 23 October 2011 to help the club stay in the top tier.

On 13 January 2017, Lang transferred to his hometown club Hebei China Fortune with his teammate Zhang Chengdong. He was then loaned to Liaoning Whowin for the 2017 season on 22 January 2017. He made his debut for Liaoning on 3 March 2017 in a 1–1 away draw against Guizhou Zhicheng. Lang returned to Hebei China Fortune in 2018 but failed to play for the club due to lingering injury.

On 8 March 2019, Hebei China Fortune announced Lang's retirement and appointed him as the head of club's disciplinary committee.

International career
On 26 March 2011, Lang made his international debut in a 2-2 draw against Costa Rica in an experimental team that also saw Jin Jingdao, Lü Peng, Ma Chongchong, Ye Weichao and Zhang Xizhe make their first appearances.

Career statistics 
.

Honours

Club
Beijing Guoan
Chinese Super League: 2009

References

External links
 Player profile at Beijing Guoan website 
 Player stats at Sohu.com 
 
 

1986 births
Living people
Sportspeople from Baoding
Chinese footballers
Footballers from Hebei
Association football midfielders
China international footballers
Beijing Guoan F.C. players
Shanghai Shenxin F.C. players
Hebei F.C. players
Liaoning F.C. players
Chinese Super League players